Pankhurst is a surname, and may refer to:

Members of a prominent family of suffragettes:
 Emmeline Pankhurst (1858–1928), one of the founders of the British suffragette movement
 Richard Pankhurst (1834–1898), husband of Emmeline and noted member of the Independent Labour Party
 Christabel Pankhurst (1880–1958), a daughter of Emmeline and a fellow suffragette
 Adela Pankhurst (1886–1961), another daughter, an Australian suffragette
 Sylvia Pankhurst (1882–1960), a daughter who involved herself more with communism 
 Richard K.P. Pankhurst (1927–2017), son of Sylvia and noted Ethiopian scholar
 Alula Pankhurst, son of Richard K.P. and Ethiopian scholar
 Helen Pankhurst, daughter of Richard K.P., activist and writer

Other: 
 Henry Pankhurst, a British runner who competed in the 1908 Summer Olympics
 Kate Pankhurst, British illustrator and writer
 Robert John Pankhurst, a British geologist 

Pankhurst family